Jean Patrice Ndaki Mboulet (born May 5, 1979) is a Cameroonian volleyball player. He stands , and plays striker. Mboulet has a total of 240 caps for Cameroon. His younger brother, Yves Marcel Ndaki Mboulet, is also a volleyball player.

Biography 
In 2000, he was chosen MVP of the Cameroon League, playing in the team of Port Douala.
In 2002, he moved to France where he performed in four clubs. During the 2002/2003 season, he was competing with AS Fréjus, in the years 2003-2005 - Montpellier UC, then he played in the club of AS Cannes, with which he reached the final of the Cup of France (2006). During the 2006/2007 season, he defended the colors of volleyball Saint-Brieuc Côtes-d'Armor (Pro A).
In 2007, he joined the Japanese club Sakai Blazers. In 2008, he received the award for the best player of V-League and, in 2009, he was selected for the sixth season.

External links
 

1979 births
Cameroonian men's volleyball players
Living people